General elections were held in Georgia on 11 October 1992, in which voters elected both the Parliament and the Chairman of Parliament, who also acted as Head of State as the President, Zviad Gamsakhurdia, was in exile after being ousted in a coup in January. Independent candidate Eduard Shevardnadze was the only candidate in the election for Head of State, whilst the Peace Bloc won the most seats in Parliament. Voter turnout was 74.2%.

Results

Head of State

Parliament

References

1992 in Georgia (country)
Parliamentary elections in Georgia (country)
Georgia
Single-candidate elections
Election and referendum articles with incomplete results